Thomas F. Timlin (September 28, 1863October 29, 1903) was an American businessman and politician from Milwaukee, Wisconsin.  He was a member of the Wisconsin State Assembly, representing Milwaukee's 6th Assembly district during the 1903 session, but died before the end of his term.

Background 
Timlin was born in Mequon, Wisconsin, on September 28, 1863, and came to Milwaukee in 1868. He was educated at St. Gall's Academy; after graduating he was in the grocery business until 1893 when he was appointed tax assessor of the fourth assessment district, a job he left in 1900, resigning to go into the real estate and fire insurance business.

Politics 
In 1902, Timlin was chosen as the Democratic nominee in Milwaukee's 6th Assembly district.  This was the first election after the 1901 redistricting act in which the 6th district moved from a northeast city lakeshore district to a downtown district, taking much of the territory of the previous 1st and 2nd Assembly districts.  In the general election, he defeated Republican Bart J. Ruddle and Social Democrat William H. Statz.  He was assigned to the standing committee on ways and means.

Death 
Timlin died of pneumonia on October 29, 1903. The Assembly passed a resolution in March 1905, as part of a memorial for Timlin and two other members who had passed away since the end of the 1903 session. He would be succeeded in the Assembly by fellow Democrat Thomas F. Ramsey (who was also an insurance and real-estate agent).

Personal life and family
Timlin was one of at least four children born to Irish American immigrants William and Ellen ( Bohan) Timlin.  During his childhood, his father adopted their cousin—William H. Timlin—who had been orphaned.  William H. Timlin later went on to become a prominent lawyer and a justice of the Wisconsin Supreme Court.

Thomas Timlin married Clara Bauer in 1893.  They had at least four children together, who all survived him.

References

1863 births
1903 deaths
American grocers
People from Mequon, Wisconsin
Businesspeople from Wisconsin
Politicians from Milwaukee
Democratic Party members of the Wisconsin State Assembly
Insurance agents
Real estate brokers
Marquette University High School alumni
Deaths from pneumonia in Wisconsin
American people of Irish descent
20th-century American politicians